Pietro Speciale (29 September 1876 – 9 November 1945) was an Italian fencer. He won a silver medal in the individual foil event at the 1912 Summer Olympics and a gold in the team foil at the 1920 Summer Olympics.

References

1876 births
1945 deaths
Italian male fencers
Olympic fencers of Italy
Fencers at the 1908 Summer Olympics
Fencers at the 1912 Summer Olympics
Fencers at the 1920 Summer Olympics
Olympic gold medalists for Italy
Olympic silver medalists for Italy
Sportspeople from Palermo
Medalists at the 1912 Summer Olympics
Medalists at the 1920 Summer Olympics
Olympic medalists in fencing